Kent Carlsson (born 3 January 1968) is a former tennis player from Sweden. A seasoned claycourter, he won all nine of his ATP tour singles titles on the surface, including the 1988 Hamburg Masters. Carlsson achieved a career-high singles ranking of World No. 6 in September 1988.

Playing career

Juniors
Carlsson was a successful junior winning the Kalle Anka Cup, which is a Swedish junior tournament through the under 11, under 13s twice and under 15. He still holds the record for the most titles wins at 4 in front of Thomas Enqvist and Thomas Johansson who won it 3 times. Carlsson was also a three time European Champion between 1981–83. In 1983 he won the Orange Bowl over Emilio Sánchez and won the Roland Garros Boys' Singles title in 1984 without losing a set, defeating Mark Kratzmann in the final.

Pro tour
Carlsson played his first professional match in 1983 losing to Heinz Günthardt in Geneva. 1984 was his first full year on tour and made the 3rd round of Roland Garros losing to Andrés Gómez, who defeated him as well in the 1985 and 1986 Roland Garros events. Carlsson won his first challenger title without losing a set in Neu-Ulm defeating Raúl Viver.

After losing to Mats Wilander at Barcelona of October 1984, Carlsson did not play his first tournament until April 1985 in Bari, where he lost to Emilio Sánchez. Playing a mixture of ATP events and challengers, Carlsson made his first ATP tour final in Hilversum losing to Ricki Osterthun in 5 sets after having a 2 sets to 0 lead; he won his second challenger in Messina defeating Ronald Agénor.

Starting the 1986 season in April, Carlsson won his first title on the ATP in Bari by defeating Horacio de la Peña. He made two finals in Madrid, losing to Joakim Nyström and at Bordeaux, losing to Paolo Canè. Carlsson made his one and only appearance at the US Open losing to Pavel Složil in 3 sets, after that he won his second career title in Barcelona and made his Davis Cup debut against Czechoslovakia defeating Miloslav Mečíř 6–0, 6–2, 6–4, reversing his defeat by Mečíř in the semi-finals of Hamburg.

In 1987 Carlsson retired against Mečíř at Indian Wells with a knee injury which plagued his career and restricted him to playing mostly on clay and only 13 career matches on hardcourts. He came back and won two titles, both against Emilio Sánchez in the final, at Nice and Bologna. With the title in Bologna Carlsson only dropped 10 games for the tournament, 5 of which were in the first match. That is the record for the fewest games dropped to win an International Series tournament Carlsson said that this was his best tournament of his career. In addition to the two titles, Carlsson made two finals at Boston and Indianapolis which was played on green clay losing to countryman Mats Wilander both times. Carlsson won both his singles matches for Sweden against France in the Davis Cup quarter finals at Fréjus defeating Thierry Tulasne 6–1, 3–6, 6–1, 6–2 and Henri Leconte 7–5, 6–2, 7–5. Carlsson had another surgery in August after withdrawing from the event at St. Vincent.

1988 was Carlsson's best year coming back from knee surgery in April he won his first title of the year in Madrid over Fernando Luna without losing a set. He won the German Open without losing a set defeating Henri Leconte in the final making use of his heavy topspin off both sides, especially the forehand side. He followed that up with a semi final performance at the Rome Masters losing to Ivan Lendl. Carlsson lost to Jonas Svensson in 5 sets at Roland Garros in the fourth round. Carlsson won 3 more titles after Wimbledon, at Kitzbühel defeating Emilio Sánchez, St. Vincent defeating Thierry Champion and his last career title at Barcelona defeating Thomas Muster. In Davis Cup Carlsson defeated Thierry Tulasne in a dead rubber at Båstad, he was also a finalist at Geneva losing to Marián Vajda and at Palermo losing to Mats Wilander.

After the successful 1988, Carlsson had more problems with his knees, but was able to make the final at Athens losing to Ronald Agénor and played his last professional match at Kitzbühel losing to Christian Saceanu. Then after another knee operation Carlsson announced his retirement in May 1990

After tennis

I believed I was at my best, when I trained a lot and was never going to lose because of conditioning. I lost because my opponent was better on the day".

During his early years playing tennis Carlsson used to travel around in a caravan and ate in the tennis hall restaurant to save money. He is also critical of many of today's players who he believes are too spoilt.

After retirement from the professional tour Carlsson trained Magnus Norman, Thomas Johansson, Nicklas Kroon and Aki Rahunen. After living in Monaco, Carlsson moved back to Sweden and became a horse trainer for trotting races. He developed the interest as a teenager and it was natural for him to take this as a new career and said "there is a great deal of satisfaction from training a horse from the beginning".

Career finals

Singles: 17 (9 titles – 8 runners-up)

References

External links
 
 
 

1968 births
Living people
French Open junior champions
People from Eskilstuna
People from Monte Carlo
Swedish expatriates in Monaco
Swedish male tennis players
Grand Slam (tennis) champions in boys' singles
Sportspeople from Södermanland County